Anomalepis mexicana is a species of snake in the Anomalepididae family.

Geographic range
It is endemic to Nicaragua, Costa Rica, Panama, and Peru.

Description
Rounded snout, moderately prominent; nostrils lateral; rostral rather small; prefrontals and frontal subequal, the former forming a median suture; supraoculars well developed; eye distinguishable under the ocular; two superposed preoculars, the lower in contact with the labials; two small suboculars; two upper labials. Total length 32 times diameter of body; tail rounded, broader than long. 22 scales around body; a pair of enlarged preanals. Reddish brown, lighter ventrally, scales with a yellowish-white border. 130 mm (inches) in total length.

References

Anomalepididae
Snakes of Central America
Snakes of South America
Reptiles of Costa Rica
Reptiles of Nicaragua
Reptiles of Panama
Reptiles of Peru
Reptiles described in 1860